Jaroslav Šíp (24 November 1930 – 6 November 2014) was a Czech basketball player and coach. He was voted to the Czechoslovakian 20th Century Team in 2001.

Playing career

Club career
During his club playing career, Šíp won five Czechoslovakian League championships (1954, 1955, 1956, 1957, and 1959).

National team career
Šíp competed with the senior Czechoslovakian national team at the men's tournament at the 1952 Summer Olympics. He also competed with Czechoslovakia at the 1951 EuroBasket, where he won a silver medal, at the 1955 EuroBasket, where he won a silver medal, at the 1957 EuroBasket, where he won a bronze medal, and at the 1959 EuroBasket, where he won a silver medal.

Coaching career
During his coaching career, Šíp won seven Czechoslovakian League championships (1965, 1966, 1970, 1971, 1974, 1981, and 1982). He also won the European-wide secondary level FIBA Saporta Cup championship, in the 1968–69 season.

References

External links
 

1930 births
2014 deaths
Basketball players at the 1952 Summer Olympics
Czech basketball coaches
Czech men's basketball players
Olympic basketball players of Czechoslovakia
Place of birth missing
Virtus Bologna coaches